Meron School is an elementary school in the north part of Tel Aviv, on the Yarkon River bank.

History 
The school was founded in 1960. It emphasizes moral and academic excellence, fostering Israeli values, democratic and social, religious Zionist identity development, and bringing out the best qualities of the student. The school educates to mutual responsibility and involvement, contact and partnership with the community, and he was chosen to lead an educational initiative, creativity and innovation in the field of cyber serving the complex and changing needs of the individual, of Tel Aviv and of the State of Israel.

School campus 
The school campus includes the old northern wing that was built in 1960 and includes some of the classrooms, secretaries and management, and the southern wing newly inaugurated in September 2016. This wing includes two floors of classrooms and laboratories organized around an internal courtyard, and a sports hall located on the third floor intended for use of school and community use in the afternoon and evening. The building was designed by the architects Moti Bodek and Dana Oberson.

Gallery

External links
 Meron School official website
  Meron School Gallery

Schools in Israel
Buildings and structures in Tel Aviv
Educational institutions established in 1960